Ilie Savu (9 January 1920 – 16 November 2010) was a Romanian footballer who played as a goalkeeper. He was Steaua București's first goalkeeper.

Playing career 
Born in Cornățelu, Dâmbovița County, Romania, Savu began his career at 14 years of age, playing as a striker and as a goalkeeper. He played two seasons for Prahova Ploiești before he moved to Bucharest, where he played five seasons for Venus București. In this period he also played two matches in the Romania national youth team. After Venus, he signed with Corvinul Deva where, in a period of four years, he played only a few matches because of the Second World War. After the war, he signed with Steaua București, being the goalkeeper of the first Steaua squad. He played three years for Steaua before his retirement.

Manager career 
He was the manager of Steaua's Gold Team in 1956 when the team won the championship and played in a tourney in England. After Steaua, he managed Corvinul Hunedoara and saw the team promoted into Liga I. He returned in 1964 to Steaua, but after only two years he left the team.

Death
Savu died on 16 November 2010, shortly after midnight, at the Central Military Hospital in Bucharest, losing a battle with a hepatic disease.

Honours
Player
Venus București
Romanian League: 2
1938–39, 1939–40

Manager
Steaua București
Romanian League: 1
1956 as co-trainer for Ştefan Dobay
Romanian Cup: 2
1965–66, 1966–67

References

External links

People from Dâmbovița County
Romanian footballers
CSM Deva players
Romanian football managers
FC Steaua București managers
CS Corvinul Hunedoara managers
CS Corvinul Hunedoara players
FC Steaua București players
FC Steaua București presidents
2010 deaths
1920 births
Association football goalkeepers
Deaths from cirrhosis